The 2010–11 Coastal Carolina Chanticleers men's basketball team represented Coastal Carolina University during the 2010–11 NCAA Division I men's basketball season. The Chanticleers, led by fourth year head coach Cliff Ellis, played their home games at Kimbel Arena and are members of the Big South Conference. They won the Big South regular season championship for the second year in a row and hosted the semi-finals and championship game of the 2011 Big South Conference men's basketball tournament. They were defeated by UNC Asheville in the tournament final. As regular season champions who failed to win their conference tournament, the Chanticleers earned an automatic bid to the 2011 National Invitation Tournament where they were defeated in the first round by Alabama. They finished the season with a record of 28–6, 16–2 in Big South play.

Roster

Schedule
 
|-
!colspan=9| Regular season

|-
!colspan=9| Big South Conference tournament

|-
!colspan=9| National Invitation Tournament

References

Coastal Carolina
Coastal Carolina Chanticleers
Coastal Carolina Chanticleers men's basketball seasons